Saorsa is a collection of short stories in Scottish Gaelic edited by Joan NicDhòmhnaill and John Storey and published by Ùr-sgeul in 2011.  While varied, the stories explore the shared themes of moral ambiguity, subversion and law breaking.  Crime, drugs, plastic surgery, poverty, abuse, neoliberalism, tourism, cultural identity, migration, murder, love, betrayal, politics, social and economic history are some of the topics explored in the collection.

The stories 

In all, Saorsa includes 13 new short stories from 13 writers:

Luathas-teichidh by Tim Armstrong
Dh'fhalbh sin, 's thàinig seo by Maureen NicLeòid
Dorsan by Annie NicLeòid Hill
An Fhianais by Màiri Anna NicDhòmhnaill
An Comann by Seonaidh Adams
Saorsa gun chrìch by Mìcheal Klevenhaus
An Drochaid by Mona Claudia Wagner
Sandra agus Ceit by Seònaid NicDhòmhnaill
Playa de la Suerte by Gillebrìde Mac 'IlleMhaoil
Iain MacAonghais by Neil McRae
Euceartas Ait by Cairistìona Stone
An Dotair Eile by Pàdraig MacAoidh
Chanadh gun do chuir i às dha by Meg Bateman

Reception 
The collection was generally praised.  Aonghas MacNeacail wrote in a review in the West Highland Free Press that the Saorsa was "a reason for hope and excitement", and Moray Watson wrote in his review in Northwords Now that the collection advanced the development of Gaelic prose in general.

References

External links 
 Review in Northwords Now (Summer 2012)
  CLAR - Ur-Sgeul imprint publishers 

2011 anthologies
Scottish Gaelic literature